Allsvenskan 1999, part of the 1999 Swedish football season, was the 75th Allsvenskan season played. Helsingborgs IF won the league ahead of runners-up AIK, while Kalmar FF, Malmö FF and Djurgårdens IF were relegated.

Summary
On 30 October 1999, in the final round, Helsingborgs IF won the Swedish Championship by defeating IFK Göteborg, 1–0, in an away game following a goal by Arild Stavrum.

League table

Relegation play-offs

Results

Season statistics

Top scorers

Footnotes

References 

Print
 
 
 

Online
 
 

Allsvenskan seasons
Swed
Swed
1